Matthew Darrell Zaba (born July 14, 1983) is a Canadian former professional ice hockey goaltender who played one game in the National Hockey League with the New York Rangers in 2010. The rest of his career, which lasted from 2007 to 2015, was spent in the minor leagues and later in the Italian and  Austrian leagues.

Playing career
Zaba was originally selected 231st overall in the 2003 NHL Entry Draft by the Los Angeles Kings.

Zaba played for New York Rangers of the National Hockey League. He made his NHL debut  in the 2009–10 season on January 23, 2010, replacing Henrik Lundqvist in a game against the Montreal Canadiens.

Unable to earn a new contract with the Rangers, Zaba left as a free agent to Europe, ending up in the Italian Serie A with HC Bolzano.

After two successful seasons with the Foxes, Zaba moved to the Neighbouring EBEL, signing a contract with the Vienna Capitals on May 8, 2012.

After three seasons with the Vienna Capitals, Zaba retired from professional hockey to take up a Goaltending coach position with the under-18 side the Colorado Rampage on July 25, 2015.

Career statistics

Regular season and playoffs

Awards and honours

References

External links

1983 births
Living people
Bolzano HC players
Canadian expatriate ice hockey players in Austria
Canadian expatriate ice hockey players in Italy
Canadian ice hockey goaltenders
Charlotte Checkers (1993–2010) players
Colorado College Tigers men's ice hockey players
Hartford Wolf Pack players
Ice hockey people from Saskatchewan
Idaho Steelheads (ECHL) players
Los Angeles Kings draft picks
New York Rangers players
Penticton Panthers players
Sportspeople from Yorkton
Vernon Vipers players
Vienna Capitals players